The 2018 FIFA World Cup qualification UEFA Group F was one of the nine UEFA groups for 2018 FIFA World Cup qualification. The group consisted of six teams: England, Slovakia, Scotland, Slovenia, Lithuania, and Malta.

The draw for the first round (group stage) was held as part of the 2018 FIFA World Cup Preliminary Draw on 25 July 2015, starting 18:00 MSK (UTC+3), at the Konstantinovsky Palace in Strelna, Saint Petersburg, Russia.

The group winners, England, qualified directly for the 2018 FIFA World Cup. The group runners-up, Slovakia, were eliminated as the worst runners-up.

Standings

Matches
The fixture list was confirmed by UEFA on 26 July 2015, the day following the draw. Times are CET/CEST, as listed by UEFA (local times are in parentheses).

Goalscorers
There were 74 goals scored in 30 matches, for an average of  goals per match.

5 goals

 Harry Kane
 Adam Nemec

4 goals

 Leigh Griffiths
 Robert Snodgrass

3 goals

 Fiodor Černych
 Josip Iličić

2 goals

 Adam Lallana
 Daniel Sturridge
 Arvydas Novikovas
 Vykintas Slivka
 Chris Martin
 James McArthur
 Marek Hamšík
 Róbert Mak
 Vladimír Weiss
 Roman Bezjak
 Benjamin Verbič

1 goal

 Dele Alli
 Ryan Bertrand
 Gary Cahill
 Jermain Defoe
 Eric Dier
 Alex Oxlade-Chamberlain
 Marcus Rashford
 Jamie Vardy
 Danny Welbeck
 Andrei Agius
 Alfred Effiong
 Jean Paul Farrugia
 Stuart Armstrong
 Christophe Berra
 Steven Fletcher
 Andrew Robertson
 Ondrej Duda
 Ján Greguš
 Juraj Kucka
 Stanislav Lobotka
 Martin Škrtel
 Valter Birsa
 Boštjan Cesar
 Rene Krhin
 Rok Kronaveter
 Milivoje Novaković

1 own goal

 Martin Škrtel (against Scotland)
 Miha Mevlja (against Slovakia)

Discipline
A player was automatically suspended for the next match for the following offences:
 Receiving a red card (red card suspensions could be extended for serious offences)
 Receiving two yellow cards in two different matches (yellow card suspensions were carried forward to the play-offs, but not the finals or any other future international matches)

The following suspensions were served during the qualifying matches:

Notes

References

External links

Qualifiers – Europe: Round 1, FIFA.com
FIFA World Cup, UEFA.com
Standings – Qualifying round: Group F, UEFA.com

F
England–Scotland football rivalry
2016 in Lithuanian football
2017 in Lithuanian football
England at the 2018 FIFA World Cup